Central Election Commission of Bosnia and Herzegovina (CEC BiH; ,) is the administrative body responsible for regulating and supervising the election process in Bosnia and Herzegovina. The CEC also oversees the work of local and regional election commissions, which regulate the electoral process in lower administrative units.

History

Establishment
The Provisional Election Commission (PEC) ceased to exist after the Parliamentary Assembly of Bosnia and Herzegovina adopted the Election Law of Bosnia and Herzegovina at a session of the House of Representatives held on 21 August 2001, and at a session of the House of Peoples held on 23 August 2001. The Election Commission of Bosnia and Herzegovina was thus established.

On 16 November 2001, the High Representative appointed members of the Election Commission from the list proposed by the Provisional Commission for Appointments which consisted of members of the Commission for Electing and Appointing Judges of the Court of Bosnia and Herzegovina and international members of the Election Commission.

The following persons were appointed as members of the Election Commission: Branko Petrić, representative of the Serbs, Lidija Korać, representative of the Croats people, Hilmo Pašić, representative of the Bosniaks, Vehid Šehić, representative of the Others and Robert S. Beecroft, Gerhard Enver Schrönbergs and Ambassador Victor Tkachenko, representatives of the International community.

First and second sessions
The constitutional first session of the Election Commission was held on 20 November 2001, and thus the Provisional Election Commission officially ceased to exist. A decision on establishing the Secretariat of the Election Commission was passed at the same session. The Secretariat conducts professional and administrative-technical duties for the Election Commission, the Complaints and Appeals Council and the Appellative Council.

At the second session of the Election Commission held on 27 November 2001, Lidija Korać was elected its first president. The Election Commission of Bosnia and Herzegovina adopted its Rules of Procedure at the same session.

Rotation procedure
At 46th session of the Election Commission held on 27 February 2003, a rotation procedure on the office of president of this institution was made. Hilmo Pašić was elected second president and Vehid Šehić was elected third president. Since 30 March 2022, Suad Arnautović has served as president of the Central Election Commission of Bosnia and Herzegovina.

Pursuant to Article 2.6 of the Election Law of Bosnia and Herzegovina, the President of the Central Election Commission is appointed from amongst its members. Each member of the Central Election Commission, a Croat, a Bosniak, a Serb and a representative of the Others, shall perform the duty of the president of the Central Election Commission according to the rotation principle, once in seven (7) years for the period of twenty-one (21) months.

The Election Commission of Bosnia and Herzegovina changed its name to the Central Election Commission of Bosnia and Herzegovina in April 2006.

Members
The current members of the Central Election Commission of Bosnia and Herzegovina are:

Suad Arnautović, president
Vlado Rogić, member
Ahmet Šantić, member
Irena Hadžiabdić, member
Jovan Kalaba, member
Vanja Bjelica-Prutina, member
Željko Bakalar, member

List of presidents
At the 46th session of the Election Commission of Bosnia and Herzegovina, held on 27 February 2003, the rotation procedure on the office of president of this institution was made.

See also
Politics of Bosnia and Herzegovina
Elections in Bosnia and Herzegovina
Elections in Republika Srpska

References

External links
Website of the Central Election Commission in English

Bosnia
Elections in Bosnia and Herzegovina